Captain W. E. Banks CBE, DSC was the first Commander of the Royal Ceylon Navy. He was appointed on 2 December 1950 until 25 November 1951. He was succeeded by J. R. S. Brown.

References

Commanders of the Navy (Sri Lanka)
Commanders of the Order of the British Empire